Oxyurichthys mindanensis is a species of goby found in the western Pacific (Japan and the Philippines).

References

Nakabo, T., 2002. Fishes of Japan with pictorial keys to the species, English edition I. Tokai University Press, Japan, pp v-866.

mindanensis
Fish of the Pacific Ocean
Fish of the Philippines
Fish of Japan
Taxa named by Albert William Herre
Fish described in 1927